The 1960 All-Ireland Senior Hurling Championship was the 74th staging of the All-Ireland hurling championship since its establishment by the Gaelic Athletic Association in 1887. The championship began on 10 April 1960 and ended on 4 September 1960.

Waterford were the defending champions, however, they were defeated in the provincial championship. Wexford won the title after defeating Tipperary by 2-15 to 0-11 in the All-Ireland final.

Teams

A total of thirteen teams contested the championship.

Team summaries

Results

Leinster Senior Hurling Championship

First round

Quarter-final

Semi-finals

Final

Munster Senior Hurling Championship

Quarter-finals

Semi-finals

Final

All-Ireland Senior Hurling Championship

Final

Championship statistics

Top scorers

Overall

In a single game

Scoring

Widest winning margin: 32 points 
Tipperary 10-9 - 2-1 Limerick (Munster quarter-final, 3 July 1960)
Most goals in a match: 13 
Waterford 9-8 - 4-8 Galway (Munster quarter-final, 26 June 1960)
Most points in a match: 26 
Wexford 2-15 - 0-11 Tipperary (All-Ireland final, 4 September 1960)
Most goals by one team in a match: 10 
Tipperary 10-9 - 2-1 Limerick (Munster quarter-final, 3 July 1960)
Most goals scored by a losing team: 4 
Galway 4-8 - 9-8 Waterford (Munster quarter-final, 26 June 1960)
Cork 4-11 - 4-13 Tipperary (Munster final, 31 July 1960)

Miscellaneous

 Wexford's defeat of Tipperary in the All-Ireland final is their first championship victory over Tipperary.

Sources

 Corry, Eoghan, The GAA Book of Lists (Hodder Headline Ireland, 2005).
 Donegan, Des, The Complete Handbook of Gaelic Games (DBA Publications Limited, 2005).
 Sweeney, Éamonn, Munster Hurling Legends (The O'Brien Press, 2002).

External links
 1960 All-Ireland Senior Hurling Championship results

References

1960